Jacque is a given name and a surname which may refer to:


People
 Jacque Batt (died 2014), American First Lady of Idaho 1994-1999
 Jaque Fourie (born 1983), South African former rugby union rugby player
 Jacque Fresco (1916–2017), American futurist and self-described social engineer
 Jacque Jack Jenkins (American football) (1921-1982), American football player
 Jacque Jones (born 1975), American Major League Baseball assistant hitting coach and former player
 Jacque LaPrarie, American college football player in the early 1980s
 Jacque MacKinnon (1938-1975), American League Football and National League Football player
 Jacquelyn Jacque Mercer (1931-1982), winner of the Miss America beauty pageant in 1949
 Jacqueline Jacque Reid (born 1975),  American television and radio host, journalist and former news anchor
 Jacque Robinson (born 1963), American football player
 Jacque Vaughn (born 1975), American National Basketball Association assistant coach and former player
 Andre Jacque (born 1980), American politician
 Charles Jacque (1813–1894), French painter of animals and engraver
 Olivier Jacque (born 1973), French former Grand Prix motorcycle road racer

Fictional characters
 the title character of the 1772 Daniel Defoe novel Colonel Jack, also spelled Jacque

See also
 Jacq, surname
 Jacques (disambiguation)

Masculine given names
Hypocorisms